Alexandru Octavian Ioniță; born 5 August 1989) is a Romanian professional footballer who plays as a striker.

Club career 
Ioniţă began his youth career in the summer of 1999, when he joined Viscofil București.

Rapid București 
In summer 2006, he was scouted by Rapid București, where he initially played for the reserve team. In 2008, he was loaned to Rocar București for which he scored four goals from nine games.

In February 2010 he was transferred to German side 1. FC Köln for a fee of €2.5 million, but he remained at Rapid București until 1 July 2010.

1. FC Köln 
Ioniţă signed a four-year contract. He had limited playing time at Köln in his first season. In May 2011, he suffered a ligament injury in his right ankle which kept him out of action for several months.
Therefore, he made only seven league appearances during the 2010–11 season.

In January 2012 after his return from injury, Ioniţă was loaned back to Rapid București for six months, with the Bucharest team having the first option to buy the player for €800,000.

He then moved in Turkey signing a one-year contract with the Turkish side Ordurspor. In 2014, he moved in Cyprus and signed with AEL Limassol. He returned in Romania due to family reasons, where he had spells with Voluntari and ASA Târgu Mureș. On 13 January 2017, he parted ways with ASA Târgu Mureș, citing financial instability of the Romanian clubs.

Honours

Club
UTA Arad
 Liga II: 2019–20

References

External links 
 
 

1989 births
Living people
Footballers from Bucharest
Romanian footballers
Romania under-21 international footballers
Association football forwards
Bundesliga players
Liga I players
FC Rapid București players
AFC Rocar București players
1. FC Köln players
AEL Limassol players
FC Voluntari players
ASA 2013 Târgu Mureș players
Liga II players
FCV Farul Constanța players
CS Sportul Snagov players
FC UTA Arad players
Liga III players
Romanian expatriate footballers
Expatriate footballers in Germany
Romanian expatriate sportspeople in Germany
TFF First League players
Romanian expatriate sportspeople in Turkey
Expatriate footballers in Turkey
Cypriot First Division players
Expatriate footballers in Cyprus